The Mizrahi Democratic Rainbow Coalition (HaKeshet HaDemocratit HaMizrahit) is a social justice organization among Mizrahi Jews (Jews from Arab and Muslim lands and the East) in Israel.

They describe themselves as an "a-political, non-parliamentary social movement whose goal is to affect the current public agenda with the aim of bringing a change into the Israeli society as a whole and to its institutions… [to] implement values of democracy, human rights, social justice, equality and multiculturalism." The organization describes itself as "Mizrahi in its goals, universal in its beliefs and open to all those who identify with its values." 
The Keshet was founded in 1996 by a group of leading intellectuals, thinkers and artists, among them Prof. Yehouda Shenhav, Dr. Ishak Saporta, Dr. Yossi Dahan, Dr. Vicki Shiran, Dr. Henriette Dahan Kalev, Dr. Dolly Benhabib, Ms. Shosh Gabay, Prof. Yossi Yona, Hana Azoulay HaSfari, Dr. Sami Shalom Chetrit, and many others.

The current manager of the Keshet is Ms. Nurit Haghagh.

The Keshet is active in a plethora of fields, both as a sophisticated think tank and at the grass-roots level.

Fields of Activity and Issues
 Closing the gaps in Israeli society that foster discrimination 
 Advancement of standards for civil equality for Mizrahim
 Just distribution of land use
 Public housing rights advocacy
 Dissemination of information about Mizrahi issues through public education
 Promotion of Mizrahi culture and artists
 Cross-cultural talks between Arabs and Jews
 Women's Issues and Feminism

Projects

Developing The Missing Link-Mizrahi Jews and Palestinian Arab Citizens in Israel as Builders of Democracy, Peace and Justice:
This project cultivates the development of a new set of allies, Mizrahi Jews and Palestinian Arab Citizens in Israel, by promoting the idea that divisions between Mizrahim and Palestinian Arab Citizens in Israel are a contrived situation which can be changed by re-orientating the relationship towards a sense of solidarity based on shared experiences and destiny. Developing solidarity between the groups include critical dialogue on shared and disparate experiences as disempowered and excluded groups in society and ‘deconstructing’ the experiences that pitted these groups against one another economically and socially. The relationship between Mizrahi Jews and the Palestinian Arab minority in Israel could become the critical bridge needed to reconcile cultural, linguistic and political gaps in understanding and agreement between the two peoples and a powerful force for peace and justice in Israel and Palestinian territories. The Mossawa Center - The Advocacy Center for Arab Citizens in Israel is a partner in the upcoming project.

Mobile Academy Project:
The proposed project intends to work within some of Israel's most weakened communities to provide participants with the knowledge, consciousness, skills and tools to stand up for their rights to decent and fair education, housing, employment and cultural expression. The Mobile Academy targets four cities that have large concentrations of disempowered groups, such as Mizrahim, immigrants from Ethiopia and the former Soviet Union, and Arabs, which inhabit poor and resource-deprived neighborhoods.

Accomplishments
 Public Housing Reform: During the 90’s, the Mizrahi Democratic Rainbow–New Discourse played a major role in passing 3 laws that created meaningful change in public housing  rights. The laws include The Public Housing Law, which enabled tens of thousands of poor people throughout the country to obtain ownership of their previously publicly owned rented homes, in 1998, The Public House Tenants Rights Law, also in 1998, and The Public House Tenants Regulations in 2000.
 Winning the legendary 2002 High Court of Justice case on social housing rights, which has influenced national policy-making as well as the practice of house ownership by disadvantaged and minority groups all over the country.  This case was a legal precedent on distributive justice, and is taught in law schools.
 On August 28, 2002, the Israeli Supreme Court ruled in favor of the Mizrahi Democratic Rainbow–New Discourse appeal and against the Israel Lands Administration in decisions no. 727, 737 and 727. A High Court petition was submitted in 2003 by the Land Forum, whose members include the Mizrahi Democratic Rainbow–New Discourse, Bimakom, Adam, Teva Ve Din and the Human Right Association, to minimize the Israeli Lands Administration use of procedures that change land destinations from agricultural to non-agricultural use, benefitting corporations over the public interest.
 The publication of a number of highly respected academic publications.

References
 Katz, Sue, "What's Left of the Left in Israel", Z Magazine, December 2004, 16-19.
 English-language page on their official site

Anti-racist organizations in Israel
Human rights organizations based in Israel
Jewish anti-racism
Mizrahi Jewish culture in Israel